Muizz Mustapha (born 3 April 2000) is a professional rugby league footballer who plays as a  or  for the Castleford Tigers in the Betfred Super League.

He previously played for the Leeds Rhinos, where he spent time on-loan at the Bradford Bulls, Featherstone Rovers and the Dewsbury Rams in the RFL Championship and the Newcastle Thunder in Betfred League 1.

Background
Mustapha was born in Nigeria.

Career

Leeds Rhinos
In 2018 he made professional début on loan at Featherstone Rovers and has also spent time at the Dewsbury Rams in the Betfred Championship.

In 2019 he made début for Leeds v Workington Town in the Challenge Cup.

On 18 November 2020 it was announced that Mustapha would join Hull KR on a season-long loan starting in 2021.

Hull Kingston Rovers (loan)
Mustapha made a total of 8 appearances for Hull KR in the 2021 Super League season including the club's 28-10 semi-final defeat against the Catalans Dragons.

Bradford Bulls (loan)
On 2 December 2021, it was reported that he had signed for Bradford in the RFL Championship on loan.

Castleford
On 3 October 2022, Mustapha signed a one-year deal to join Castleford.

International
On 11 September 2019 Mustapha was called up for the Nigeria 60-man training squad.

References

External links
Leeds Rhinos profile
SL profile

2000 births
Living people
Bradford Bulls players
Dewsbury Rams players
Featherstone Rovers players
Hull Kingston Rovers players
Leeds Rhinos players
Newcastle Thunder players
Nigerian rugby league players
Rugby league second-rows